Oaksterdam is a cultural district on the north end of Downtown Oakland, California, where medical cannabis is available for purchase in cafés, clubs, and patient dispensaries.  Oaksterdam is located between downtown proper, the Lakeside, and the financial district. It is roughly bordered by 14th Street on the southwest, Harrison Street on the southeast, 19th Street on the northeast, and Telegraph Avenue on the northwest. The name is a portmanteau of "Oakland" and "Amsterdam," due to the Dutch city's cannabis coffee shops and
the drug policy of the Netherlands.  
Since 2005, cannabis has been available to patients with patient identification and physician recommendation at a busy dispensary in the neighborhood, one of Oakland's four officially licensed dispensaries under the current municipal ordinance.  According to Proposition 215, a statewide voter initiative which amended the California Health and Safety Code, marijuana used for medical purposes is legal to possess and cultivate. Dispensaries  require a doctor's note in order to obtain medical cannabis, which is legal under California Law, but still illegal under the federal Controlled Substances Act.

History
The name Oaksterdam is a combination of Oakland and Amsterdam, the Dutch city that is famously tolerant towards cannabis use. The term was coined by the late Jim McClelland, an AIDS patient, who was a founding member of the Oakland Cannabis Buyers Club and the Berkeley Patients Group after prompting by Andrew Glazier, a fellow activist, that the neighborhood needed a name.
The history of Oaksterdam started with Oakland Buyers Cooperative Distributing to Prop 215  patients with acts of courage mixed with legal wrangling  they stayed open until the federal authorities became an issue. After the federal authorities ordered the Oakland Cannabis Buyers Cooperative (OCBC) to shut down, a few OCBC members (like the late Jim McClelland and late Tim Sidwell) went around the corner and opened up The Zoo. The Zoo was a well stocked dispensary with deals that had clones as well as advice on how to cultivate. Soon after that a proliferation of clubs opened: The Bulldog, Compassionate Caregivers, The Lemon Drop, Oakland Patients Group, and 420 Cafe.

Dan Lundgren went on a political warpath after Prop 215 was passed. Dennis Peron was arrested and San Francisco's safe source of medical cannabis was shut down. The Oakland City Council made a few proclamations then promptly made a few patients official medical cannabis officers like Jeff Jones and Ed Rosenthal as well as approved the distribution of medical cannabis as per Proposition 215. The Oakland Politicians were pro cannabis before Prop 215 and allowed a couple of groups to distribute. The Federal authorities, however, have continued to try to apply the law even though the Attorney General Eric Holder has stated publicly that the prosecution of medical cannabis is the federal authorities last priority.

On April 2, 2012 the IRS raided Oaksterdam University. Nevertheless, Oaksterdam University continued to put on classes less than two days later. Incorrect reports often cite that the event was conducted by the DEA. No charges were filed.  Harborside has been also been threatened as well.
Steve DeAngelo spoke out against the raids and the IRS threats and vowed to serve the patients. He reminded his followers about the patients locked up in jail. In DeAngelo's opinion, The DEA is systematically trying to destroy the medical cannabis community. 
Melinda Haag, the DEA prosecutor, has warned the city about dispensary closures. The IRS has also taken away the standard tax deduction claiming that the medical cannabis community is a criminal enterprise.
Richard Lee dissolved his interest in his businesses, paving the way for a new generation of leadership.

Location and character
Oaksterdam is located on the north end of downtown Oakland, between downtown proper, the Lakeside and the Financial District.  It is roughly bordered by 14th Street on the southwest, Harrison Street on the southeast, 19th Street on the northeast, and Telegraph Ave on the northwest. It is characterized by mixed-use office and residential buildings with unique historic architecture that is older than some of the more modern skyscrapers south of 14th Street, and an abundance of ground floor retail shop spaces, restaurants and cafes.

A Julia Morgan-designed building is located at the northwest corner of 15th and Webster Streets, which was the original location of the Oakland YWCA. The neighborhood also features the Cathedral Building, an ornate, historic Flatiron Building at Latham Square at the intersection of Broadway and Telegraph.

Educational institutions
The district features at least two institutions of higher learning: Lincoln University at 15th and Franklin and Oaksterdam University located at 1734 Telegraph Avenue.

Transportation infrastructure

Mass transit
The 19th Street BART station is located beneath Oaksterdam on Broadway between 17th and 20th Streets. The station has entrances on Broadway and on a pedestrian plaza that opens onto Telegraph Avenue. AC Transit also recently opened the Uptown regional transit center nearby on Thomas L. Berkley Way (20th Street) which features multiple bus shelters with seating, NextBus arrival prediction signs and Rapid Bus service.

Bicycle rental

A bicycle rental service has openedin the neighborhood on 15th Street being one of the only bicycle rental stores in the area.  The bike shop also incorporates a glass-blowing school.

Pedicab service

Recently. a pedi-cab service (Oaksterkabs) was opened and is staffed by a single cycle rickshaw. Now dubbed "The Cannabis Cruiser", the pedicab offers its services around the downtown area to students of Oaksterdam University, Oaksterdam employees, and to any pedestrian.

Neighborhood retail
The district is home to a number of coffee shops, a tea shop, a hydroponic supply store, cafes, restaurants, a gift shop, two musical instrument stores, and specialty stores. These shops and services are also attractive to cannabis tourists and enjoy a superior central location next to the 19th Street BART station and AC Transit connections.

Medical cannabis dispensation
Since legislative changes were passed by the Oakland City Council in 2005, there is no longer a proliferation of cannabis dispensaries in the neighborhood. Most of these dispensaries had the chance to obtain non-profit status; however, some chose to remain for-profit and were therefore no longer permitted to dispense cannabis. Under current legislation, there are four officially permitted dispensaries in the City of Oakland.  One of the four permits is held by a dispensary cafe in the neighborhood.

"Measure Z clubs"

"Measure Z" (as of 2014, Measure Z referred to a new Oakland public safety ballot measure ) clubs are businesses that sell cannabis to people over the age of 18.  One private club in Oaksterdam sells cannabis and food containing cannabis to adults who do not hold valid physician recommendations for medical marijuana which are needed to obtain county-issued patient identification cards in California. One such club is named after Oakland's Measure Z, a city ballot initiative, which makes the private sales, cultivation, and possession of cannabis the lowest police priority and mandates that the City of Oakland tax and regulate cannabis as soon as possible under state law.

The Oaksterdam News
From 2005 to 2007, Oaksterdam University founder Richard Lee published the Oaksterdam News, a quarterly newsprint periodical covering news in the California cannabis movement, with a circulation of 100,000. In 2008, Lee went on to found West Coast Cannabis (edited by author and activist Ngaio Bealum), which covers similar news stories as the Oaksterdam News in a magazine format. Oaksterdam News editor, Chris Conrad, went on to found the West Coast Leaf , with his wife Mikki Norris, which ran with a circulation of 175,000 until 2013.

See also

 Oakland Cannabis Buyers' Cooperative

Adjacent Oakland neighborhoods and attractions

Adams Point
Chinatown
Downtown Oakland
Jack London Square
Lake Merritt
Lakeside Apartments District
Oakland City Center
Old Oakland
Uptown Oakland

References

External links
 Oaksterdam.com  Oaksterdam news, community calendar, history
 OaksterdamUniversity.com Official site of Oaksterdam University

Neighborhoods in Oakland, California
Economy of Oakland, California
Oakland
Cannabis culture
Healthcare in the San Francisco Bay Area
Cannabis in California